Roger Mosey (born 4 January 1958) is a British author, broadcaster, and current Master of Selwyn College, Cambridge. He was previously the Head of BBC Television News and Director of the Beijing 2008 and London 2012 Olympic Games coverage. His other positions have included that of Producer to the BBC's New York bureau and Editor of Today on BBC Radio 4. He is a trustee of the Royal Institute of British Architects.

In October 2013, Mosey became Master of Selwyn College, Cambridge. He often contributes articles and columns to international newspapers including The Guardian, The Times, The Spectator, New Statesman, and the Daily Telegraph.

Education
Mosey was born in Bradford in 1958 and educated at Bradford Grammar School. He then studied at Wadham College, Oxford, where he received a degree in history and modern languages. He appeared on University Challenge in 1978, as a member of the team representing his college.

In 2011, Mosey was awarded an honorary doctorate by the University of Lincoln.

Career
After university he joined Pennine Radio, Bradford, as a Community Affairs Producer; his BBC career began in 1980 when he joined BBC Radio Lincolnshire as a reporter.  His first job in network radio was on The Week in Westminster, and he then moved to Today Programme as a producer and to the BBC's New York bureau before becoming editor of PM in 1987.

He was editor of Radio 4's Today from March 1993 until appointment as Controller of BBC Radio Five Live at the beginning of 1997. Under his editorship, Today won Sony Gold Awards in 1994 and 1995, a British Environment & Media Award and was named “Radio Programme of the Year” by the Broadcasting Press Guild in 1995.

BBC Radio Five Live was named the Sony National Radio Station of the Year 1998; and BBC Television News won a number of Royal Television Society awards for journalism, including “Programme of the Year” for Newsnight (2002) and the Ten O'Clock News (2004). The Ten O'Clock News also received BAFTA awards in both 2004 and 2005.

He recruited James Naughtie to join the Today presenting team and introduced Nicky Campbell, Victoria Derbyshire and Richard Littlejohn to Five Live. He brought Dermot Murnaghan and Natasha Kaplinsky to the BBC to present Breakfast.  He is a Fellow of The Radio Academy.

In 2003, when Head of News at the BBC, Mosey was asked to head a landmark workstream looking at the BBC's values. As Head of Sport he cancelled Grandstand after a 48-year run and oversaw the move to Salford Quays in 2010. He was in charge of the BBC's coverage of the 2012 Olympics. He was replaced as Head of Sport by Barbara Slater, who oversaw the move of BBC Sport to MediaCityUK in Salford Quays in 2011. He became the BBC's Editorial Director in May 2013, but this appointment proved to be short lived. Upon leaving the BBC, Mosey wrote of the various biases in the work of the organisation. Writing in The Times, he said that the organisation was too left-wing, had failed to "give enough space to anti-immigration views or to EU-withdrawalists" and had uniformity in its views. Mosey proposed that the organisation should share the licence fee with others.

In 2013, Mosey was elected to succeed Richard Bowring as Master of Selwyn College, Cambridge. Announced on 2 July, he took up the role in October 2013. In 2013 it was announced Mosey would be the Chair of Bishop Grosseteste University's university council.

Personal life
His interests include football (he is a Bradford City fan), movies, and reading thrillers and political biographies.

References

Further reading
 Mosey, Roger: Getting Out Alive – News, Sport & Politics at the BBC, Biteback (2015);

External links
 BBC Press Office biography

1958 births
Living people
Alumni of Wadham College, Oxford
BBC executives
Masters of Selwyn College, Cambridge
Contestants on University Challenge
English radio producers
English television producers
English television executives
People associated with Bishop Grosseteste University
People associated with the University of Lincoln
People educated at Bradford Grammar School